Paraguay competed in the 2015 Pan American Games in Toronto, Canada from July 10 to 26, 2015.

Swimmer Benjamin Hockin was the flagbearer of the country at the opening ceremony.

Competitors
The following table lists Paraguay's delegation per sport and gender.

Medalists

The following competitors from Paraguay won medals at the games. In the by discipline sections below, medalists' names are bolded.

|align="left" valign="top"|

Athletics

Paraguay qualified three athletes (one man and two women).

Men
Field events

Women
Road events

Combined events – Heptathlon

Key
SB = Seasonal best
DNF = Did not finish

Canoeing

Slalom
Paraguay qualified the following boats:

Football

Men's tournament

Paraguay qualified a men's team of 18 athletes.

Roster

Group B

Golf

Paraguay qualified a team of three golfers (one man and two women).

Roller sports

Paraguay qualified one male athlete.

Figure
Men

Rowing

Paraguay qualified a total of five rowers and four boats (three male and two female).

Qualification Legend: FA=Final A (medal); FB=Final B (non-medal); R=Repechage

Shooting

Paraguay qualified one shooter.

Men

Squash

Paraguay received a men's wildcard slot.

Swimming

Paraguay qualified six swimmers (five men and one woman).

Men

Women

Table tennis

Paraguay qualified a men's team of three athletes. The men's table tennis team won a silver medal, the first ever for the country in table tennis at the Pan American Games. The silver also equaled the best result by any athlete/team from the country at the games.

Men

Taekwondo

Paraguay received a wildcard to enter one male athlete. Matias Fernandez was disqualified prior to the event, and did not compete.

Men

Tennis

Paraguay qualified four tennis players (one male and three female).

Triathlon

Paraguay received a wildcard to enter one female triathlete.

Women

Wrestling

Paraguay received one wildcard in women's freestyle. However, later Stephanie Bragayrac was disqualified from the games for doping. Bragayrac did not compete in the event, and her opponent in the first round won by default.

Women's freestyle

See also
Paraguay at the 2016 Summer Olympics

References

Nations at the 2015 Pan American Games
P
2015